Asepalum is a genus of flowering plants belonging to the family Orobanchaceae.

Its native range is Northeastern and Eastern Tropical Africa to Iraq.

Species:

Asepalum eriantherum

References

Orobanchaceae
Orobanchaceae genera